M. Ozella Shields Head (born October 19, 1869) was an American author.

Biography
M. Ozella Shields Head was born in Macon, Georgia, on October 19, 1869. She was educated in Atlanta, Georgia.

Her taste for literature and her talent for production were shown in childhood, when she wrote a number of love stories. Her first published work, a sensational love story of thirty chapters, was "Sundered Hearts." published in the Philadelphia Saturday Night, when Shields was eighteen years old. Her next works were "Verona's Mistake" and "A Sinless Crime," published in the same journal. Other stories followed in quick succession. In 1889 she brought out her "Izma, or Sunshine and Shadow" through a New York house.

In November 1889, she married Daliel B. Head, of Greenville, Missouri, and had one son, Dan.

References

External links
 

1869 births
Writers from Macon, Georgia
19th-century American women writers
Year of death missing
19th-century American novelists
American women novelists
Novelists from Georgia (U.S. state)
Wikipedia articles incorporating text from A Woman of the Century